Julie Gonzales is an American politician who is a member of the Colorado Senate from the 34th district in the City and County of Denver. She is a Democrat.

Political career
Gonzales was elected in the general election on November 6, 2018, winning 83 percent of the vote over 17 percent of Republican candidate Gordon Alley. She currently serves as the Majority Caucus Chair and is a member of the Senate Finance, Judiciary, Appropriations, and Legislative Audit Committees.

References

Democratic Party Colorado state senators
Living people
21st-century American politicians
21st-century American women politicians
Women state legislators in Colorado
Hispanic and Latino American state legislators in Colorado
Hispanic and Latino American women in politics
Year of birth missing (living people)